The 2012 Princeton Tigers football team represented Princeton University in the 2012 NCAA Division I FCS football season. They were led by third-year head coach Bob Surace and played their home games at Powers Field at Princeton Stadium. They are a member of the Ivy League. They finished the season 5–5 overall and 4–3 in Ivy League play to places in a three-way tie for third. Princeton averaged 7,984 fans per game. Captain Mike Catapano was Ivy League Defensive Player of the Year. He was drafted in the 2013 NFL Draft by the Kansas City Chiefs with the first pick of the seventh round (207th overall) becoming Princeton's first draftee since Dennis Norman in the 2001 NFL Draft.

Schedule

References

Princeton
Princeton Tigers football seasons
Princeton Tigers football